Choi Song-hyun (born April 11, 1982) is a South Korean actress. Choi began her television career as a KBS announcer in 2006, then she resigned from the network in 2008 to focus on acting. She has since starred in films and television dramas such as Insadong Scandal (2009), Mrs. Town (2009), Prosecutor Princess (2010), and I Need Romance (2011).

Filmography

Television series

Film

Variety show

Musical theatre

Awards and nominations

References

External links
 
 
 
 
 

1982 births
Living people
Actresses from Seoul
South Korean film actresses
South Korean musical theatre actresses
South Korean television actresses
South Korean television presenters
South Korean women television presenters
Yonsei University alumni
Korea University alumni
Signal Entertainment Group artists